The 2015 Women's European Volleyball Championship was the 29th edition of the European Volleyball Championship, organised by Europe's governing volleyball body, the Confédération Européenne de Volleyball. It was hosted by Netherlands and Belgium from 26 September to 4 October 2015. The championship managers were the Dutch Olympic gold volleyball medalist Peter Blange and the former Belgian volleyball player Virginie De Carne. Russia defeated Netherlands 3–0 in the final to capture their 19th title, while Tatiana Kosheleva was elected most valuable player back to back.

Qualification

Format
The tournament was played in two different stages. In the first stage, the sixteen participants were divided in four groups of four teams each. A single round-robin format was played within each group to determine the teams group position (as per criteria below). The three best teams of each group (total of 12 teams) progressed to the second stage, with group winners advancing to the quarterfinals while second and third placed advanced to the playoffs.

Pool standing criteria
 Number of matches won
 Result points (3 points for 3–0 or 3–1 win; 2 points for 3–2 win; 1 point for 2–3 loss)
 Sets ratio
 Points ratio
 Result of the last match between the tied teams

The second stage of the tournament consisted of a single-elimination, with winners advancing to the next round. A playoff was played (involving group second and third places) to determine which teams joined the group winners in the quarterfinals, followed by semifinals, 3rd place match and final.

Pools composition
The drawing of lots was held in Antwerp, Belgium on 12 November 2014. First, the hosts and the team which was chosen by the hosts were seeded at the top of each pool. Then the next 4 teams which ranked highest in the previous edition were drawn. Finally, the other teams were drawn. Numbers in brackets denote the European ranking as of 25 September 2015.

Squads

Venues

Preliminary round
All times are Central European Summer Time (UTC+02:00).

Pool A
venue: Omnisport, Apeldoorn, Netherlands

|}

Pool B
venue: Lotto Arena, Antwerp, Belgium

|}

Pool C
venue: Topsportcentrum, Rotterdam, Netherlands

|}

Pool D
venue: Indoor-Sportcentrum, Eindhoven, Netherlands

|}

Championship round
All times are Central European Summer Time (UTC+02:00).
venues:
Lotto Arena, Antwerp, Belgium
Ahoy, Rotterdam, Netherlands

Playoffs

|}

Quarterfinals

|}

Semifinals

|}

Bronze medal match

|}

Final

|}

Final standing

Individual awards

Most Valuable Player
 
Best Setter
 
Best Outside Spikers
 
 

Best Middle Blockers
 
 
Best Opposite Spiker
 
Best Libero
  
Fair Play Award

References
 Confédération Européenne de Volleyball (CEV)

External links

CEV Website
Results at todor66.com

Women's European Volleyball Championships
2015 Women's European Volleyball Championship
2015 Women's European Volleyball Championship
European Volleyball Championship
European Volleyball Championship
European Volleyball Championship
September 2015 sports events in Europe
October 2015 sports events in Europe
Women's volleyball in Belgium
Women's volleyball in the Netherlands
Sports competitions in Antwerp
Sports competitions in Apeldoorn
Sports competitions in Eindhoven
Sports competitions in Rotterdam
2010s in Antwerp
21st century in Eindhoven
21st century in Rotterdam